The Burdett, later Weldon Baronetcy, of Dunmore in the County of Carlow, is a title in the Baronetage of Ireland. It was created on 11 July 1723 for Thomas Burdett, who represented Carlow County and Carlow Borough in the Irish House of Commons, with remainder, in default of male issue of his own, to the male issue of his sister Anne, wife of Walter Weldon. The sixth baronet was a colonel in the British Army and High Sheriff of Queen's County.

Burdett, later Weldon baronets, of Dunmore (1723)

Sir Thomas Burdett, 1st Baronet (1668–1727)
Sir William Vigors Burdett, 2nd Baronet (1715–1798)
Sir William Bagenal Burdett, 3rd Baronet (1770–1840)
Sir Anthony Weldon, 4th Baronet (1781–1858)
Sir Anthony Crossdill Weldon, 5th Baronet (1827–1900)
Sir Anthony Arthur Weldon, 6th Baronet (1863–1917)
Sir Anthony Edward Wolseley Weldon, 7th Baronet (1902–1971)
Sir Thomas Brian Weldon, 8th Baronet (1905–1979)
Sir Anthony William Weldon, 9th Baronet (born 1947)

References
Kidd, Charles, Williamson, David (editors). Debrett's Peerage and Baronetage (1990 edition). New York: St Martin's Press, 1990.

Weldon
Baronetcies created with special remainders
1723 establishments in Ireland